Jack was a small settlement in Paradise Township, Russell County, Kansas, United States.

History
Jack was issued a post office in 1883. The post office was discontinued in 1888.

References

Former populated places in Russell County, Kansas
Former populated places in Kansas